A whistleblower is a person who exposes misconduct occurring within an organization.

Whistleblower may also refer to:

 Whistle Blower (film), a 2014 Korean film
 Whistleblower (Irish TV series), a 2008 Irish television drama series
 Whistleblower (American TV program), a 2018 American true-crime television series
 "Whistleblower" (The Office), an episode of the American television series The Office
 The Whistleblower, a 2010 thriller film
 The Whistleblowers, a 2007 crime drama
 The Whistle Blower, a 1986 British spy thriller film
 Outlast: Whistleblower, downloadable content for the video game Outlast
 Whistleblower (album), a 2007 album by Finnish musician Vladislav Delay